Cambaroides wladiwostokensis is a species of crayfish endemic to Primorsky Krai (Vladivostok) in Far East Russia.

References

Cambaridae
Freshwater crustaceans of Asia
Crustaceans described in 1934